Vylon may refer to:

Vylon, the father of Sigurd and Ethlyn and a minor non-playable character in Fire Emblem: Seisen no Keifu
Vylon, the main global manufacture and supplier of Toyobo brand for Copolyester